City Road or The City Road is a road that runs through central London. The northwestern extremity of the road is at Angel where it forms a continuation of Pentonville Road. Pentonville Road itself is the modern name for the eastern part of London's first bypass, the New Road from Paddington to Islington, which was constructed in 1756. The City Road was built in 1761 as a continuation of that route to the City of London.

From Angel, City Road runs roughly south-east and downhill past the City Road Basin of Regent's Canal and Moorfields Eye Hospital, after which it bears closer to south, and has a junction with Old Street at a large roundabout. After Old Street, it continues south, continuing past Bunhill Fields, Wesley's Chapel and the Honourable Artillery Company, after which the road continues south as Finsbury Square, then Finsbury Pavement, then Moorgate—the latter beginning at the border with the City of London. These roads form a major entry point into the City of London, and were extended in 1846 through the City itself (as Princes Street and King William Street) to connect with London Bridge.

The part of the road north of Old Street is on the London Inner Ring Road and as such forms part of the boundary of the London congestion charge zone. The ringroad continues east along Old Street. Most of the road is in the London Borough of Islington, although the stretch from Wharf Road down to the Old Street roundabout is the border between Islington and Hackney, so the two sides are in different boroughs.

The disused City Road station was on City Road itself.

London Bus routes serving the length of City Road include 43, 205, 214, 394.

The City Road and The Eagle is mentioned in an additional verse written for the nursery rhyme Pop Goes the Weasel by 1856, when it was quoted in a performance at the Theatre Royal:

The rhyme appears on the wall of the Eagle.

See also 
 Honourable Artillery Company Museum

References

Further reading
 Weinreb, Ben; Hibbert, Christopher (1983), "City Road" in The London Encyclopedia, Basingstoke: Macmillan.

Streets in the London Borough of Islington
Streets in the City of London
Honourable Artillery Company
1761 establishments in England
1760s in London